Holt Ashley (January 10, 1923May 9, 2006) was an American aeronautical engineer notable for his seminal research of aeroelasticity.

Early life and education
He was born in San Francisco, California.

Ashley attended the Massachusetts Institute of Technology (MIT), located in Cambridge, Massachusetts, from which he received a Master of Science degree in aeronautical engineering in 1948 and later a Doctor of Philosophy degree in 1951, also in aeronautical engineering.

Career
From 1951 to 1954, he was a member of the faculty at MIT. Ashley served as an MIT associate professor from 1954 to 1960.  He became a full professor at MIT in 1960, serving in that position until 1967.

In 1967, Ashley joined the Department of Aeronautics and Astronautics at Stanford University, located in Palo Alto, California, where he was a professor of aeronautics and astronautics.

He was elected to the National Academy of Engineering in 1970 "for contributions to the field of aerolastic structures and unsteady aerodynamics, aiding in the solutions of problems in vibration and gust loading".

Ashley served as president of the American Institute of Aeronautics and Astronautics (AIAA).

He also served on the advisory boards of NASA, the National Advisory Committee for Aeronautics, the U.S. Air Force and the U.S. Navy.

He died on 9 May 2006, age 83.

Legacy
The AIAA established an award in Ashley's honorthe Holt Ashley Award for Aeroelasticity.

Notable awards and honors 
 1969the AIAA Structures, Structural Dynamics and Materials Award
 1981the AIAA Wright Brothers Lecture Award
 1987the Ludwig-Prandtl-Ring from the Deutsche Gesellschaft für Luft- und Raumfahrt
 2003the AIAA the Daniel Guggenheim Medal
 2006the AIAA Reed Aeronautics Award

See also

 List of aerospace engineers
 List of Massachusetts Institute of Technology alumni
 List of Massachusetts Institute of Technology faculty
 List of people from San Francisco
 List of Stanford University people

References 

1923 births
2006 deaths
20th-century scholars
21st-century scholars
American aerospace engineers
Engineers from California
Fellows of the American Institute of Aeronautics and Astronautics
MIT School of Engineering alumni
MIT School of Engineering faculty
Members of the United States National Academy of Engineering
Writers from San Francisco
Stanford University School of Engineering faculty
American science writers
Ludwig-Prandtl-Ring recipients
20th-century American engineers